The Defense of Jingshi, also known as the Defense of Beijing, was a battle that took place between the Oirats and the Ming dynasty in 1449.

Background
As a result of trade sanctions issued by the Ming dynasty, Esen Taishii of the Northern Yuan lead an invasion against the Ming dynasty in the year 1449. In September, Esen was victorious in the Tumu Crisis, resulting in the Zhengtong Emperor being captured.

Esen attempted to use the captured Zhengtong Emperor to raise a ransom and negotiate a favorable treaty including trade benefits. The emperor's family planned to raise funds in order to secure the emperor's release. The Ming court at first was inclined to follow the counsel of Xu Youzhen, an official who suggested that since the garrison forces around Beijing were less than 100,000, the court should retreat to Nanjing while things were still in balance. This was following the example of when the Song dynasty moved to Hangzhou after the Jurchen Jin dynasty captured its capital of Kaifeng. However the Minister of War, Yu Qian rejected this proposal and said those who advocated retreat should be executed.

On 22 September, Zhu Qiyu, the younger brother of the Zhengtong Emperor became the new emperor of the Ming dynasty. Orders claiming to be issued by the previous emperor were to be ignored and no negotiations regarding the hostage situation would be entertained. The rationale was that the emperor's life is not as important as the fate of the country.

Yu Qian was promoted to minister of war although he had been already planning and arranging measures for the defense of Beijing beforehand. Yu Qian believed that a major reason for the defeat in the Tumur Crisis was caused by poor logistics and lack of supplies. Large granaries were set up and the logistic network was reworked. Reserves forces from neighboring provinces such as Shanxi, Shandong and Henan were mobilized to defend the capital and weapon manufacturing was significantly increased. By the time of the battle, Beijing had a force of around 220,000 soldiers ready.

As a result of the Ming dynasty installing a new emperor, Esen was unable to leverage the Zhengtong Emperor to obtain a deal. Therefore his chieftains agreed to move forward to invading Beijing with the claim of wanting to restore the Zhengtong Emperor to power.

Battle
On 1 October, Esen and his forces moved to capture Beijing. Their first assault was on Datong where once again, they brought the Zhengtong Emperor to the gates and explained their aim to restore him back to the throne. However the defenders ignored their request.

Esen eventually changed plans from attacking Beijing through the Juyong Pass and instead would go through the Zijing Pass. The defenders were able to hold up for several days but eventually Esen's forces managed to breakthrough and by 11 October, they had reached Beijing where they were facing the Deshengmen and Xizhimen gates from its corner in the north west.

On 12 October, Esen once again tried his diplomatic approach but was rebuffed by Ming forces. Then Esen invited the Ming court to send leading officials to escort the Zhengtong Emperor back to the capital hoping to take more high ranking hostages. However the Ming court only sent out two low ranking officers and therefore the ploy failed.

On 13 October, Esen attacked the Deshengmen gate. However a tactic Yu Qian frequently employed was to lure Esen's forces in the cities and then shut the gates once they were in. Inside the cities were Shenjiying lying in ambush who would attack the trapped forces using ranged weapons such as firearms and rockets. Esen's brothers were killed in these attacks. 

Fighting continued for the next few days where Ming forces would constantly use the same ambush tactics. 

On 17 October, Esen realized with his forces outnumbered and with any reinforcements being blocked from coming through the Juyong Pass, that there was no chance of success and withdrew from Beijing.

Aftermath
On 20 October, Esen sent envoys to negotiate a peace deal with the Ming court. On 8 November, Esen's forces moved outside the Great Wall.

Esen continued attempting to use Zhengtong Emperor to negotiate with the Ming court but to no avail as the new emperor was gaining power and had no intention of giving it back to his brother. Eventually Esen released the Zhengtong Emperor in 1450. This was because he saw no advantage keeping him any longer and the Mongol economy relied on their trade with the Ming dynasty so Esen was obligated to reopen negotiations.

Esen faced criticism for his failure to capitalize his initial victory over the Ming. Certain historians have argued that Esen had not only failed to win better terms than the prior arrangements, he was forced to accept less favorable terms in return for resumption of trade with the Ming. In 1453 Esen declared himself Khan where internal conflict broke out and 2 years later was assassinated by his own men.

The Ming dynasty underwent a restructuring of the organization of its armed forces and allowed more oversight from the capital bureaucracy rather than just the eunuchs.

The Jingtai Emperor was impressed with Yu Qian's accomplishment and promoted him to be the Crown Prince's Guardian and Tutor. However in 1457, the previous Zhengtong Emperor successfully launched a coup and overthrew his brother, the Jingtai Emperor. Yu Qian was falsely accused of treason and sentenced to death. Many of Yu Qian's enemies called for him to be executed by slow slicing but the Zhengtong Emperor reduced his sentence to public beheading. Yu Qian was posthumously rehabilitated nine years later by the Chenghua Emperor.

References

Sources

Beijing
Beijing
1449 in Asia
15th century in China
Beijing
Military history of Beijing